Villa Haux is a villa in the Art Nouveau style built in 1908 by architects Richard Böklen and Carl Feil in the southern German town of Ebingen.

It was built for Kommerzienrat Friedrich Haux (1860–1929), entrepreneur in the local textile industry, between his factory and a railway line crossing the town on a bridge.

His previous residence and office, built as functional timber-framing house in 1885 on the same place and just decorated neo-baroque in 1898, was relocated across a street.

The new villa was equipped with most modern installations, such as elevator, central heating and central vacuum cleaner.

The Haux family lived in the houses until 1954. Afterwards, the new villa was used for their business and rented to various users. From 1978 it was empty.
In 1991 a new owner started renovating it. Today the Klaiber-Schlegel tax advisor society owns and uses it. Some rooms are available for cultural events.

In the old villa, there was a pharmacy from 1964 until 1991. Since then it is a pub. The railway is abandoned.

References 
 Peter Thaddäus Lang: Albstadt - Stadt zwischen Bergen und Tälern. S. 7-11, hier: S. 10f. In: Blätter des Schwäbischen Albvereins. 109. Jahrgang. Ausgabe Mai/Juni 3/2003
 Gerhard Penck: Die phantastische Geschichte der Villen des Friedrich Haux. Wasmuth-Ernst-Verlag, September 2008.

External links 
 

Buildings and structures in Zollernalbkreis
Art Nouveau architecture in Germany
Houses completed in 1908
Villas in Germany
Art Nouveau houses
1908 establishments in Germany